WGES (680 AM 92.9 FM) is a radio station broadcasting a Spanish language religious format. It is licensed to St. Petersburg, Florida, United States, and serves the Tampa Bay area.  The station is owned by Vision Communications Network, Inc. It is also home to Spanish-language broadcasts of Tampa Bay Rays baseball.

External links
FCC History Cards for WGES

GES
Metromedia